The University of West Yangon, located in Htantabin, Yangon Division, is a liberal arts and sciences university in Myanmar. The university offers bachelor's and master's degrees in liberal arts and science. Students who wish to pursue post-graduate (especially PhD) studies typically go to Yangon University.

Degrees
Classified as an Arts and Science university in the Burmese university education system, West Yangon University 
offers bachelor's and master's degree in common liberal arts and sciences disciplines. Its ordinary Bachelor of Arts (BA) and Bachelor of Science (BSc) take four years to complete, honours degrees BA (Hons) and BSc (Hons) take five years and master's degrees MA, MSc and MRes take seven and eight years.

References

External links 
 

Universities and colleges in Yangon Region
Arts and Science universities in Myanmar
Universities and colleges in Myanmar